The 2010 Miami FC season was the fifth season of the club.  Previously, they fielded a team in the USL First Division.  Along with other clubs, Miami FC broke away from the previous league to form the new North American Soccer League.  Nonetheless, the club fielded a team in the NASL Conference of the USSF Division 2 Professional League, the second tier of the American Soccer Pyramid at the time.  (The USSF D2 was a temporary professional soccer league created by the United States Soccer Federation (USSF) in 2010 to last just one season.  It was a compromise between the debating United Soccer Leagues (USL) and the North American Soccer League (NASL) while the USSF determined which league would eventually receive second or third division status).  This year the team finished fourth in the NASL Conference Standings and ninth in the playoff standings, missing the post season.  This was the last year of the team as the new NASL was launched the following year.  The club connected with the original Fort Lauderdale Strikers club and launched a new team and franchise in the NASL under the Strikers' name starting in the 2011 season.

Conference table

2010 roster

Staff
Head Coach:  Victor Pastora 
Assistant Coach:  Marcelo Neveleff 
Goalkeeper Coach:  Ricardo Lopes 
Director of Soccer:  Fernando Clavijo 
General Manager:  Luiz Muzzi

Competitive

Preseason

Regular season

U.S. Open Cup

References

External links
Miami FC

Miami FC (2006) seasons
Miami FC
USSF Division 2 Professional League
Miami FC